The 1897 LSU Tigers football team represented Louisiana State University (LSU) during the 1897 Southern Intercollegiate Athletic Association football season. Coach Allen Jeardeau returned for his second but final year at LSU in 1897 for two games in Baton Rouge.  A yellow fever outbreak throughout the South caused the postponement of LSU's classes starting and the football season being cut back to only two games.

Schedule

Roster

Roster from Fanbase.com and LSU: The Louisiana Tigers

References

LSU
LSU Tigers football seasons
LSU Tigers football